The Chairman of the Parliament of Kabardino-Balkaria is the presiding officer of that legislature.

Chairmen of the Supreme Soviet

Chairman of the Council of the Republic

Chairmen of the Council of Representatives

Chairmen of the Parliament of the Kabardino-Balkar Republic

References

Politics of Kabardino-Balkaria
Lists of legislative speakers in Russia